Larry John Loughlin (August 16, 1941 – January 26, 1999) was a relief pitcher in Major League Baseball who played briefly for the Philadelphia Phillies during the 1967 season. He was born in Tacoma, Washington.
 
A star pitcher with the Santa Clara University baseball team, Loughlin played in the 1962 College World Series. He entered the major leagues in 1967 with the Phillies, appearing for them in three games. He posted a 15.19 ERA and did not have a decision or saves, giving up nine runs on nine hits and four walks while striking out five in 5 innings of work.

A double in his only MLB plate appearance left him with a rare career 1.000 batting average.

Following his majors career, Loughlin played in the California Angels and Montreal Expos minor league systems until 1970. After that, he worked as a mechanic in his native Tacoma.

Loughlin died in Denver, Colorado, at the age of 57.

See also
1967 Philadelphia Phillies season
Cup of coffee

References

External links

Retrosheet
Historic Baseball - Obituary

1941 births
1999 deaths
Baseball players from Tacoma, Washington
American expatriate baseball players in Canada
Major League Baseball pitchers
Philadelphia Phillies players
Hawaii Islanders players
Eugene Emeralds players
San Diego Padres (minor league) players
Bakersfield Bears players
Macon Peaches players
Buffalo Bisons (minor league) players
Winnipeg Whips players
Santa Clara Broncos baseball players